Bethan Witcomb is a Welsh actress, known for playing Zoe in the Sky One series Stella.

Filmography

Theatre

References

External links
 

Living people
Welsh television actresses
People from Ebbw Vale
Year of birth missing (living people)
Alumni of the Royal Welsh College of Music & Drama
21st-century Welsh actresses